National Highway 522 (NH 522) (previously NH 100) is a  National Highway in India. This highway runs entirely in the state of Jharkhand.

References

National highways in India
National Highways in Jharkhand